The Original Wailers are a reggae group formed by Al Anderson and Junior Marvin in 2008.  Both are best known as guitarists for Bob Marley and the Wailers as well as former members of The Wailers Band.  In April 2011, Marvin departed the band.

Discography

Miracle EP (2012)

Four songs from the album are penned by singer & keyboardist, Desi Hyson. Backing singer Erica Newell, formerly of the Melody Makers sings on the cover of "Our Day Will Come".

MRG Recordings released The Original Wailers debut EP Miracle on 10 April 2012.  Miracle was nominated for Best Reggae Album at the 55th Annual Grammy Awards on 5 December 2012.

Personnel
 Produced by Al Anderson and Karl Pitterson
 Recorded and Engineered by Karl Pitterson at Clubhouse Studio in Rhinebeck, NY
 Mixed by Karl Pitterson, Jason Corsaro and Al Anderson.
 Mastered by Tom Ryan at Gateway Mastering, Portland, ME

References

External links
 

2008 establishments in Jamaica
Jamaican reggae musical groups
Jamaican backing bands